Livingston Hall (May 5, 1903 – November 18, 1995) was most notably the Roscoe Pound Professor of Law at Harvard Law School. He graduated from Harvard Law in 1927 before working in private practice and as a US Attorney. Hall returned to Harvard and began teaching in 1932. He retired in 1971.

During World War II, Hall served in the Army as a lieutenant colonel. He received the Congressional Medal of Freedom in 1946. In 1985, the ABA established the Livingston Hall Juvenile Justice Award due to Hall's efforts in the area of juvenile law.

During Hall's career, he participated in a number of committees and studies. A collection of over 3000 papers has been assembled and made available for study.  

Hall was married to Elizabeth Blodgett Hall, founder of Simon's Rock College.

Sources
 New York Times Obituary
 ABA Livingston Hall Juvenile Justice Award

External links

1903 births
1995 deaths
Harvard Law School alumni
Harvard Law School faculty
American legal scholars
United States Army personnel of World War II